The Charlotte Amalie Historic District in Charlotte Amalie in Saint Thomas, U.S. Virgin Islands is a  historic district which was listed on the National Register of Historic Places in 1976.

The district then included 574 contributing buildings, three contributing structures, and a contributing object. It included the entire Charlotte Amalie National Historic Site (also known as St. Thomas National Historic Site, which was a National Historic Site from December 24, 1960, until February 5, 1975, when it was disbanded and transferred to Virgin Islands, to be administered as a territorial park). It also included the entire local Charlotte Amalie Historic and Architectural Control District.

European construction in the district began with the building of Fort Christian in c.1666;  the town of Charlotte Amalie was platted in 1681.

Notable properties include:
Fort Christian (c.1666-1680), modified in 1874
Legislative Building (1874), built as barracks for the Danish police force, in 1976 this was home for the Virgin Islands Senate. 3. *Emancipation Park, honoring 1848 emancipation of slaves

Commercial Hotel and Coffee House (1839–40), also formerly known as the Grand Hotel, 44 Norre Gade.  Greek Reivival with an arcaded first floor.

References

National Register of Historic Places in the United States Virgin Islands
Greek Revival architecture in Virgin Islands
Buildings and structures completed in 1666
Charlotte Amalie, U.S. Virgin Islands